Joyce Mary Apio (born 29 July 1996) is a Ugandan cricketer. In July 2018, she was named in Uganda's squad for the 2018 ICC Women's World Twenty20 Qualifier tournament. She made her Women's Twenty20 International (WT20I) for Uganda against Scotland in the World Twenty20 Qualifier on 7 July 2018.

In April 2019, she was named in Uganda's squad for the 2019 ICC Women's Qualifier Africa tournament in Zimbabwe. In June 2019, she was the leading wicket-taker in the 2019 Kwibuka Women's T20 Tournament, with ten dismissals in six matches.

References

External links
 

1996 births
Living people
Ugandan women cricketers
Uganda women Twenty20 International cricketers
Place of birth missing (living people)